All of the 55 Councillor seats for Suffolk Coastal were up for election on Thursday 3 May 2007. This was held on the same day as other local council elections across England.

Overall election result

References

Suffolk Coastal District Council elections